Cristián Felipe Abarca Foncea (born 20 May 1989) is a Chilean former footballer.

He played for clubs like Colo-Colo or Rangers of the Primera B. In the clubs that he played, Abarca was frequently used as right back or centre back.

Honours

Club
Colo-Colo
 Primera División de Chile (3): 2006–A, 2006–C, 2007–A
 Copa Sudamericana (1): Runner-up 2006

 Universidad de Concepción
 Primera División de Chile (1): Runner-up 2007 Clausura

References

External links
 
 Abarca at Football Lineups

1989 births
Living people
Footballers from Santiago
Chilean footballers
Chile youth international footballers
Chilean expatriate footballers
Association football defenders
Colo-Colo footballers
Universidad de Concepción footballers
San Luis de Quillota footballers
Magallanes footballers
Deportes Magallanes footballers
O'Higgins F.C. footballers
Rangers de Talca footballers
Trasandino footballers
San Antonio Unido footballers
Deportes Melipilla footballers
Chilean Primera División players
Tercera División de Chile players
Primera B de Chile players
Segunda División Profesional de Chile players
Segunda División de Costa Rica players
Expatriate footballers in Costa Rica
Chilean expatriate sportspeople in Costa Rica